

Events calendar

+10